The Battle of Deligrad was fought between Serbian revolutionaries and an army of the Ottoman Empire, and took place in December 1806 during the First Serbian Uprising. A 55,000-strong Ottoman army commanded by Albanian Pasha of Scutari Ibrahim Pasha was decisively defeated with heavy casualties and the loss of nine guns by Karađorđe Petrović's 30,000 Serbian rebels at Deligrad in Serbia.

Background 
The First Serbian Uprising had begun in 1804 with the expulsion of the ruling janissary elite and the proclamation of an independent Serbian state by the revolution's leader, Karađorđe. The Ottoman Sultan, Selim III sent a huge Turkish force to quell the uprising. The Serbian high command decided to meet the Turkish force under Ibrahim Bushati, pasha of Shkodër, at Deligrad.

Battle
The Serbian right wing numbered 6,000 men under the command of Mladen Milovanović at Bela Palanka. The center consisted of 18,000 troops which would be placed at the Kunovaci mountain. The left wing would be composed of 6,000 men under the command of Milenko Stojković with an additional 4,500 reserve troops to guard from any possible Turkish flank attack from Niš. Stanoje Glavaš would command the elite and cavalry troops whose job was to delve deep into enemy territory and harass them as much as possible. Tomo Milinović was a head of artillery and made significant effort by good positioning and frequent relocation of the cannons.

The Turkish Army consisted of 55,000 regular Nizam troops with additional auxiliary and Janissary support. The Serbian army withstood several enemy offensives. The Serbian rebels also attacked the Turkish positions numerous times and managed to capture nine Turkish cannons. Meanwhile, the elite troops of Stanoje Glavaš effectively liberated Prokuplje thereby splitting the Turkish army in two. The Turkish wing under the command of Pazvanoglu was swiftly defeated by Mladen Milovanović and the Ottoman force was routed.

Aftermath
The battle provided a decisive victory for the Serbs and bolstered the morale of the outnumbered Serbian rebels. To avoid total defeat, Ibrahim Pasha negotiated a six-week truce with Karageorge.

See also 
 Old Rashko
 Vučo Žikić

Gallery

Citations

References 
 Esdaile, Charles, Napoleon's Wars, (Viking Adult, 2008).

Deligrad
Deligrad
First Serbian Uprising
Conflicts in 1806
1806 in the Ottoman Empire
1806 in Europe
December 1806 events